The 1960–61 Western Kentucky State Hilltoppers men's basketball team represented Western Kentucky State College (now known as Western Kentucky University) during the 1960-61 NCAA University Division Basketball season. The Hilltoppers were led by future Naismith Memorial Basketball Hall of Fame coach Edgar Diddle and finished in a three-way tie for the Ohio Valley Conference championship. No conference tournament was held, so a playoff was scheduled to determine which team would go to the NCAA tournament. Western Kentucky lost in the playoff to Morehead State. Bobby Rascoe, Charlie Osborne, and Harry Todd were named to the All-Conference Team.

Schedule

|-
!colspan=6| Ohio Valley Conference Playoff

References

Western Kentucky Hilltoppers basketball seasons
Western Kentucky State
Western Kentucky State Basketball, Men's
Western KentuckyState  Basketball, Men's